Okibacterium endophyticum is a Gram-positive and non-motile bacterium from the genus Okibacterium which has been isolated from the roots of the plant Salsola affinis from Xinjiang in China.

References

Microbacteriaceae
Bacteria described in 2015